Menachem Nochum Twersky of Chernobyl (born 1730, Volhynia - died 1787, Chernobyl, Polish–Lithuanian Commonwealth) was a Ukrainian rabbi, and the founder of the Chernobyl Hasidic dynasty. He was a disciple of the Baal Shem Tov and the Maggid of Mezritch, and published one of the first works of Hasidic thought. He is considered one of the pioneers of the Hasidic movement.

Biography
Orphaned as a child, Twersky was raised by his uncle Rabbi Nochum, who sent him to be educated in one of the highly acclaimed yeshivot in Lithuania. After his marriage he earned his livelihood as a teacher of young boys, while continuing his intensive studies of Torah.

With the advent of Chassidism, Twersky became a disciple of the Baal Shem Tov, the founder of Hasidism. After the Baal Shem Tov's death, Twersky accepted the Maggid of Mezritch as his mentor. His book Me'or Einayim (Light of the Eyes) was published after his death, and contains a collection of his homilies concerning the weekly Torah portions and selections of the Talmud. The book gained widespread acceptance as one of the major works of Hasidic thought.

He was succeeded as the Maggid of Chernobyl by his son Rabbi Mordechai Twerski. The surname would become known as Twersky in the United States. The Chernobyl dynasty branched into a number of successive dynasties through Mordechai's eight sons, including those of Skver, Rachmastrivka, Trisk, and Talner.

Twersky's daughter, Malka, married Rabbi Avraham of Korostyshiv. Their daughter, Chava, wife of Rabbi Shakhna of Pohrebysche, was the mother of Rabbi Yisroel Friedman of Ruzhin.

Me'or Einayim 
Rabbi Twersky  authored the books Me'or Einayim and Yesamach Lev; they are often published together. They have gained widespread acceptance as major works and foundations of Hasidic ideology.
Me'or Einayim comprises Hasidic insights on the weekly Torah portion and Jewish holidays, influenced by Kabbalah; it was edited by his student Eliyah. 
Yesamach Lev collects Rabbi Twersky's insights on Talmudic-Aggadah.

References

External links
History of Jewish Community in Chernobyl

1730 births
1797 deaths
People from Zhytomyr Oblast
Jewish scholars
People from Volhynian Voivodeship
Rebbes of Chernobyl
Lithuanian Hasidic rabbis
Ukrainian Hasidic rabbis
Hasidic rabbis in Europe
Students of Dov Ber of Mezeritch